Blaesodactylus victori is a species of geckos endemic to Madagascar.

References

Blaesodactylus
Endemic fauna of Madagascar
Lizards of Africa
Reptiles described in 2016